Isla Muerta may refer to:

Isla de Muerta, a setting from the Pirates of the Caribbean series
Isla de Muerta (album), an album by Ten
Isla Muerta, a fictional island off the coast of Costa Rica in Michael Crichton's The Lost World
La isla de la muerte (Island of the Doomed), the alternate title of Maneater of Hydra